Lobinger is a German surname. Notable people with the surname include:

 Fritz Lobinger (born 1929), missionary and Catholic bishop in South Africa 
 Petra Lobinger (born 1967), German athlete, triple jump specialist 
 Tim Lobinger (born 1972), German pole vaulter 

German-language surnames